Porcupine quill boxes are decorative boxes, which are finely inlaid with ivory discs and porcupine quills between bands of ebony. They were highly valued for their rich timbers and intricate craftsmanship. 

Production of Ceylonese ebony and porcupine quill boxes was focused in three areas of southern Ceylon – Galle, Matara and Matura – all important trading posts, benefiting from the thriving export trade. The style of the boxes was very much aimed at the demand of the European market, boxes imitated traditional English forms such as jewellery boxes, sewing baskets and writing boxes. Although porcupine quill boxes were originally made for English residents, by the late 19th century, there was a thriving commercial export trade. The production of porcupine quill boxes and furniture falls between around 1850 and 1900. In particular there is one in the V&A museum, which was given to Queen Victoria c. 1850. 

The number of ivory dots and their close proximity together are a good indication of a valuable box. The finest boxes from Galle may have an ivory disc positioned every  on all of the ebony borders. Boxes from Matara often had two small dots directly above and below larger dots all around the border.   

The quality of the porcupine quills used is also a detail to look for. The base is thick and it tapers to a fine and very sharp point, the quills are very strong and to be used in box production must be sliced in half length ways. Clearly, boxes with broader quills from cuts near the quill base are cheaper. Conversely those with fine quills are much more desirable and thus valuable. There are two types of quill, the first with distinct dark and white bands and the other with plain blond colouration. The coloured quills were used to make chevron patterns, whilst the blond quills offered a cleaner look.  

Typically these boxes are not exceptional, however there is a small group of boxes from Matara that tend to be superior in the use of quills and ivory discs and these boxes command high prices.

The quality of timber used was not always very good, it typically was not treated or dried so the potential for warping is high.

References

Sri Lankan culture
Sinhalese culture
containers
Ivory works of art
Porcupines
Diospyros